"Afterlife" is a song by British band Bush from their fifth album The Sea of Memories. It was released as a promo single in June 2010. It was re-released to radio stations as the album's third official single in July 2012.

Music video
A lyric video was uploaded on Bush's official YouTube account to promote the single. The video shows the band performing on stage while transitioning to Gavin singing with images depicting the lyrics.

Charts

References

2010 singles
Bush (British band) songs
Songs written by Gavin Rossdale
Post-grunge songs
Song recordings produced by Bob Rock
2010 songs
Interscope Records singles